Minhou County (Foochow Romanized: Mìng-âu) is a county in the eastern Fujian Province, China, it is under the administration of the prefecture-level city of Fuzhou, the provincial capital. The Min River flows in a southeast direction through the center of the county towards Fuzhou's urban area and the Taiwan Strait.

Administrative divisions 
The county has one subdistrict,  8 towns and 6 townships.
 Subdistrict: Ganzhe subdistrict
 Town: Baisha Town, Nanyu town, Shanggan Town, Xiangqian Town, Qingkou Town, Nantong Town, Shangjie Town, Jingxi Town
 Township: Zhuqi township (竹岐乡), Pengwei Township (鸿尾乡), Yangli township, Dahu Township, Tingping Township, Xiaoruo Township

Environment 
In August 2014, 396 villagers from Qingpuling of Qingkou Town won a court case against a waste management company. They were awarded 6,000,000 RMB in compensation. The waste company set up their medical waste incineration facility back in 2000. The pollution caused black dust or ash to contaminate the surrounding environment trees, plants, waterways and households. Residents had long suspected the cancer rates was due to the environmental pollution from the incineration plant. The government has offered relocation for the affected residents.

Climate

References

External links 
 Minhou County government website

 
County-level divisions of Fujian
Fuzhou